Tatiana Stepanova, also Tetyana Stepanova, (Tatiana Stepanova) (born, Odessa, Ukraine then Soviet Union) is a highly accomplished ballerina and choreographer. She is now the artistic director of Stepanova Ballet Academy and Toronto International Ballet Theatre. As Prima Ballerina of the Odessa State Ballet Company, she was awarded the honorary title of People's Artist of Ukraine for her excellence in the art of ballet.

Stepanova is married to Ukrainian footballer Vasyl Ishchak.

Biography

Mme. Tatiana Stepanova completed her training at the world-renowned Bolshoi Ballet Academy in Moscow. Upon completion of her training, she returned to her native home in Odessa, where she was invited to perform as Principal Dancer for the Odessa State Ballet Company. It was here that Mme. Stepanova was given the opportunity to dance the Principal Roles in an extensive classical, contemporary, and modern repertoire. As an exceptionally talented dancer, she was honored with the status of Prima Ballerina. She was later recognized for her talents, by being awarded as a People's Artist of Ukraine, an honor given to those whose merits were exceptional in the sphere of development of the performing arts.

Her combination of unique style, technique, and dramatic excellence, led to Mme. Stepanova's invitation to perform and work with the legendary Ballets Russes. She was given the opportunity to work with such great artists as: Natalia Krassovska, George Zoritch, and Irina Baronova. Mme. Stepanova's international travels involved performing in many countries throughout the world including, Japan, Italy, Malta, Finland, Hungary, Bulgaria, Taiwan, Romania, and many cities across North America.

Mme. Stepanova was inspired by such great artists as Galina Ulanova, Marina Semyonova, and Maya Plisetskaya.

Stepanova Ballet Academy

In 2004 Stepanova founded Stepanova Ballet Academy, located in Thornhill, Ontario, Canada. Under the artistic direction of Stepanova, Stepanova Ballet Academy has quickly become among the premier ballet/dance schools in Ontario.

Toronto International Ballet Theatre

In 2007, Stepanova founded Toronto International Ballet Theatre. By bringing together young talented dancers with international stars to perform in professional productions with spectacular sets and beautiful choreography, Stepanova seeks to attract and expose Toronto's diverse community to the wonder and value of the art form of dance.

Under the Artistic Direction of Stepanova, Toronto International Ballet Theatre has successfully put on six professionally staged productions of The Nutcracker.

Choreographic work

 Cinderella
 Alice's Adventures in Wonderland
 Coppelia
 Graduation Ball
 Chippolino
 Hansel and Gretel
 Pinocchio 
 My Way
 Thumbelina
 Snow White
 The Nutcracker

See also
 List of Russian ballet dancers

References 
  Official page of Odessa Opera and Ballet Theater.
  Official Stepanova Ballet Academy
  Official page Toronto International Ballet Theatre

External links 
 
 Toronto International Ballet Theatre

Ballet teachers
Ballet choreographers
Dancers from Odesa
Prima ballerinas
Living people
Year of birth missing (living people)
Ukrainian emigrants to Canada
Ukrainian ballerinas